İttifaQ (Cyrillic: ИттифакЪ) is a Tatar hip-hop and r'n'b group. 

Founded in 2005, it was among the first hip-hop squads performing rap in the Tatar language. They also issued the first Tatar-language hip-hop album, Bälki (Cyrillic: Бәлки) in 2007.

Members
 Älbina Alby Söläyman 
 İlham Şärif 
 İlyäs Jahffar Ğafar 
 Nazim Padeeshah İsmağil

External links
Official site
Video of IttifaQ's song

Musical groups from Tatarstan